184th Sustainment Command is a Sustainment Command of the Mississippi Army National Guard (MS ARNG).

Structure:
  168th Engineer Brigade
 890th Engineer Battalion
 223d Engineer Battalion
 298th Support Battalion
 367th Maintenance Company
 3656th Maintenance Company
 1387th Quartermaster Company (water)
 1687th Transportation Company (medium truck)
 31st Support Detachment (Rear Operations Center) 
 114th Support Detachment (Army Liaison Team)

References

Sustainment Commands of the United States Army